An anemoscope is a device invented to show the direction of the wind, or to foretell a change of wind direction or weather.

Hygroscopic devices, in particular those utilizing catgut, were considered as very good anemoscopes, seldom failing to foretell the shifting of the wind. The ancient anemoscope seems, by Vitruvius's description of it, to have been intended to show which way the wind actually blew, rather than to foretell into which quarter it would change.

Otto von Guericke gave the title anemoscope to a machine invented by him to foretell the change of the weather, as to fair and rain. It consisted of a small wooden man who rose and fell in a glass tube as the atmospheric pressure increased or decreased. Accordingly, M. Comiers has shown that this was simply an application of the common barometer. This form of the anemoscope was invented by Leonardo da Vinci.

See also
Anemometer
Weather vane

References

Pressure gauges
Meteorological instrumentation and equipment